His Majesty's Fire Service Inspectorate (HMFSI) in Scotland operates as a body within, but independent of, the Scottish Government. The inspectorate exists to provide independent, risk based, and proportionate professional inspection of the Scottish Fire and Rescue Service (SFRS). It gives assurance to the Scottish public and Scottish Ministers that the SFRS is working in an efficient and effective way, and promotes improvement in the SFRS. It also provides independent, professional advice to Scottish government ministers and has functions in relation to non-domestic fire safety. The statutory basis of the inspectorate is set out in sections 43A to 43G of the Fire (Scotland) Act 2005. Its role was substantially amended by the Police and Fire Reform (Scotland) Act 2012 that came into effect on 1 April 2013. Its headquarters are at St Andrews House, Edinburgh.

Chief inspector 
HMFSI in Scotland operates under the leadership of HM chief inspector of the Scottish Fire and Rescue Service. The chief inspector is appointed by Order in Council. The current chief inspector is Robert Scott. It is general practice for chief inspectors to have previously served as a Principal Officer within a Fire and Rescue Service. Robert Scott served as an assistant chief officer within the Scottish Fire and Rescue Service until his retirement in 2017. He formed part of a small team that helped lead the reform of the fire and rescue services in Scotland. This process led to the creation of the new Scottish Fire and Rescue Service in 2013.

List of chief inspectors: 
Angus D Wilson 19481966
James D McNicol 19671968
John Jackson 19681978
Paddy Watters 19791983
Richard Knowleton 19841989
Alex Winton 19891993
Neil Morrison 19931999
Dennis Davis 19992003
Jeff Ord 20042007
Keith MacGillivray 2008 (Interim)
Brian Fraser 20082010
Steven Torrie 20112016
Martyn Emberson 20172018
Simon Routh-Jones 20182021
Robert D Scott 2021present

See also
Scottish Government
Fire services in the United Kingdom
His Majesty's Chief Inspector of Fire Services (England, Wales and Northern Ireland)

References

External links
The Scottish Government: HMFSI
Official website



Fire and rescue in Scotland
Organisations based in Edinburgh
Public bodies of the Scottish Government